Local elections were held in Turkey on 29 March 2009. The overall winner was the ruling party Justice and Development Party, although the party saw a decline in its vote relative to the 2007 general election. The leading opposition party, the social democratic Kemalist CHP, increased its vote share, as did a number of smaller parties including the SP, DTP and BBP, whose party leader Muhsin Yazıcıoğlu had died in a helicopter crash four days before the election. The third largest party, the Turkish nationalist MHP, enjoyed a more modest vote surge. The election was not contested by Cem Uzan's GP. The AKP failed to take certain provinces it had publicly targeted, such as Diyarbakır, İzmir and Urfa, and did not achieve its goal of exceeding 47% of the overall vote.
There was localized election-related fighting in southeastern Turkey, in which five people were reported to have been killed and about a hundred injured.

Results

Provincial assemblies

By province
Metropolitan provinces are in bold. AKP denotes provinces won by the Justice & Development Party, CHP denotes provinces won by the Republican People's Party, MHP denotes provinces won by the Nationalist Movement Party, DTP denotes provinces won by the Democratic Society Party, BBP denotes provinces won by the Great Union Party, DSP denotes provinces won by the Democratic Left Party and DP denotes provinces won by the Democratic Party.

District elections
Elections were also held for district mayors (ilçe başkanı) as well as neighbourhood presidents (muhtar).

References

Local elections in Turkey
Local